Riverside School District 96 (D96) is a school district headquartered in Riverside, Illinois.

It includes Riverside, most of North Riverside, and parts of Brookfield.

Martha Ryan-Toye became superintendent in 2016. She was previously employed by the River Forest District 90. In 2020 the D96 board gave her a five-year renewal.

Schools
Schools are in Riverside unless otherwise stated.
 Junior high school
 Hauser Junior High School

 Elementary schools
 Ames Elementary School
 Blythe Park Elementary School
 Central Elementary School
 Hollywood Elementary School (Brookfield)

References

External links
 Riverside School District 96

School districts in Cook County, Illinois
Brookfield, Illinois